Mari (or ) is a village in the Larnaca District of Cyprus, located 5 km west of Zygi. The village was largely populated by Turkish Cypriots before 1974.

References

Communities in Larnaca District
Turkish Cypriot villages depopulated after the 1974 Turkish invasion of Cyprus